Shaun Hopkins (born 23 February 1985) is a Welsh rugby union player. A prop forward, he plays club rugby for the Welsh regional team the Scarlets having previously played for Llanelli RFC.

References

External links
 Scarlets profile

1985 births
Living people
Rugby union players from Crynant
Scarlets players
Welsh rugby union players
Rugby union props